Nemanja Radović (born November 11, 1991) is a Montenegrin professional basketball player for UCAM Murcia of the Liga ACB. He can play both small forward and power forward positions.

References

External links
 Adriatic League Profile 
 Eurobasket.com Profile
 Euroleague.net Profile
 Beobasket.net Profile

1991 births
Living people
2019 FIBA Basketball World Cup players
ABA League players
Basket Zaragoza players
Basketball League of Serbia players
CB Murcia players
Forwards (basketball)
K.A.O.D. B.C. players
KK Budućnost players
KK Mega Basket players
KK Mornar Bar players
KK Vršac players
Liga ACB players
Montenegrin men's basketball players
Montenegrin expatriate basketball people in Serbia
Montenegrin expatriate basketball people in Spain
Obradoiro CAB players
People from Berane